KZUE (1460 AM) is a radio station broadcasting a Spanish variety format. Licensed to El Reno, Oklahoma, United States, the station serves the Oklahoma City area. The station is currently owned by La Tremenda Radio Mexico and uses programming from Univision Radio.

History
The first call sign of the station was KELR. The radio equipment was installed in 1962. The call sign was changed to KCAN beginning on 3 November 1978. On 18 July 1985, the station changed its call sign to the current KZUE.

KZUE stood for "The Zoo".  In the past, 102.7 had the call sign KZUE. In the spirit of the old KZUE on 102.7, the initial format as KZUE was a form of popular rock and roll. The format did not last long. The station was then sold to Nancy Galvan who changed the station to become the first Spanish-language station in the Metropolitan Oklahoma City area.

Transmitter

References

External links

Radio stations established in 1962
Regional Mexican radio stations in the United States
ZUE
ZUE
1962 establishments in Oklahoma
ZUE